is a railway station on the Tsurumi Line in Tsurumi-ku, Yokohama, Kanagawa Prefecture, Japan, operated by East Japan Railway Company (JR East).

Lines
Asano Station is served by the Tsurumi Line, and forms a junction between the Tsurumi Main Line and Umi-Shibaura Branch Line.

Station layout
Asano Station has an island platform (platforms 1 and 2) and two opposed side platforms (platforms 3 and 4) serving four tracks.

Platforms

History
The station opened on 10 March 1926, on the privately owned . The Tsurumi Rinkō line was nationalized on 1 July 1943, and was later absorbed into the Japanese National Railways (JNR) network. The station has been unstaffed since 1 March 1971. Upon the privatization of JNR on 1 April 1987, the station has been operated by JR East.

See also
 List of railway stations in Japan

References
 Harris, Ken and Clarke, Jackie. Jane's World Railways 2008-2009. Jane's Information Group (2008).

External links

 JR East Asano Station 

Stations of East Japan Railway Company
Railway stations in Kanagawa Prefecture
Railway stations in Japan opened in 1926